Valid Mashaeizadeh is an Iranian football midfielder who plays for Niroo Zamini on loan from Foolad.

Club career

Foolad
He started his career with Foolad from youth levels. Later he joined to first team by Hossein Faraki. He made his debut for Foolad in the first fixture of the 2014–15 Iran Pro League against Tractor Sazi as a substitute, where he assisted Leonard Mesarić to score Foolad's only goal.

Club career statistics

International career

U17

He played two marches at the 2010 Asian U16 Championships.

U20
He was part of Iran U–20 during 2012 AFC U-19 Championship qualification, 2012 CIS Cup, 2012 AFF U-19 Youth Championship and 2012 AFC U-19 Championship.

U23
He invited to Iran U-23 training camp by Nelo Vingada to preparation for Incheon 2014 and 2016 AFC U-22 Championship (Summer Olympic qualification).

Honours
Foolad
Iran Pro League (1): 2013–14

References

External links
 Valid Mashaeizadeh at PersianLeague.com
 Valid Mashaeizadeh at IranLeague.ir

1993 births
Living people
Iranian footballers
Foolad FC players
People from Ahvaz
Iran under-20 international footballers
Association football midfielders
Sportspeople from Khuzestan province